Dolichocarpus seawardii is a species of saxicolous (rock-dwelling), fruticose lichen in the family Opegraphaceae. It is found in the remote tropical island of Saint Helena, where it forms large patches on wet, overhanging rock ledges. It was formally described as a new species in 2008 by Dutch lichenologist André Aptroot. Thin-layer chromatography shows that the species contains erythrin; tiny translucent crystals of this lichen product encrust the hyphae of the medulla. The photobiont partner, dispersed throughout the medulla, is an orange-coloured member of genus Trentepohlia, with cell diameters of about 10 μm. The species epithet honours lichenologist colleague Mark Seaward, who encouraged the author to conduct the lichen survey at this location. Dolichocarpus seawardii is only known to occur on Saint Helena, where it forms large patches on The Barn, and below Little Stone Top.

References

External links
 Pictures of Tropical Lichens – Image of species 

Arthoniomycetes
Lichen species
Lichens described in 2008
Taxa named by André Aptroot
Lichens of the middle Atlantic Ocean